Stendal-Uchtetal was a Verwaltungsgemeinschaft ("collective municipality") in the district of Stendal, in Saxony-Anhalt, Germany. The seat of the Verwaltungsgemeinschaft was in Stendal. It was disbanded on 1 January 2010.

The Verwaltungsgemeinschaft Stendal-Uchtetal consisted of the following municipalities:

References

Former Verwaltungsgemeinschaften in Saxony-Anhalt